Football Club Bex  are a football team from Bex, Switzerland. Who currently play in the 2L Inter Group 1.

External links
  Official Website

Association football clubs established in 1902
Football clubs in Switzerland
1902 establishments in Switzerland